Matthew Shipp (born December 7, 1960) is an American pianist, composer, and bandleader.

Early life and education
Shipp was raised in Wilmington, Delaware, and began playing piano at six years old. His mother was a friend of trumpeter Clifford Brown. He was strongly attracted to jazz, but also played in rock groups while in high school. Shipp attended the University of Delaware for one year, then the New England Conservatory of Music, where he studied with saxophonist/composer Joe Maneri. He has cited private lessons with Dennis Sandole (who also taught saxophonist John Coltrane) as being crucial to his development.

Later life and career
Shipp moved to New York in 1984 and has been very active since the early 1990s, appearing on dozens of albums as a leader, sideman, or producer. Before making a living playing music, Shipp worked in a bookshop as an assistant manager. He was fired, he threw some books at his boss, and he decided he would not look for a day job anymore. He was initially most active in free jazz but has since branched out, particularly exploring music that touches on contemporary classical, hip hop, and electronica. At the beginning of his career Shipp was stylistically compared to some of his predecessors in the jazz piano pantheon but has since been recognized as a complete stylistic innovator on the piano – with AllMusic referring to his "unique and recognizable style"; and Larry Blumenfeld in Jazziz magazine referring to Shipp as "stunning in originality." Jazziz also referred to Shipp's CD 4D as "further proof of his idiosyncratic genius." David Bowie, when a guest on Courtney Pine’s Jazz Crusade on BBC Radio 2 in 2005, praised Shipp, specifically ‘Rocket Ship’ from the album Nu Bop. Punk-rock icon Henry Rollins wrote in 2010, ″Matthew Shipp and his work have fascinated me since I first heard him many years ago. His originality and approach sometimes stretches the limits of what is considered Jazz music yet at the same time, describes perfectly the fierce freedom of it. … Matthew is not only a brilliant Jazz pianist, he is a true artist and visionary."

Shipp was a longtime member of saxophonist David S. Ware's quartet with bassist William Parker and a series of drummers (Marc Edwards, Susie Ibarra, Guillermo E. Brown, Whit Dickey). The group recorded for Homestead (2 albums), 
Thirsty Ear (2), AUM Fidelity (4), Silkheart (2), Columbia/Sony (2), and DIW (4, one picked up by Columbia but not counted as a Columbia release here). In addition, the rhythm section of Shipp, Parker, and Brown recorded Ware compositions without Ware in 2003, released by Splasc(H) Records as The Trio Plays Ware, and Shipp and Ware performed as a duo, recorded in concert and released by AUM Fidelity as Live in Sant'Anna Arresi, 2004. Critic Gary Giddens, writing in The Village Voice in 2001, declared, “The David S. Ware Quartet is the best small band in jazz today.” After Ware’s death, Shipp wrote, “Some have compared our unit to the classic Coltrane quartet, but the members of our group all brought something to the table that only someone playing now could bring—resulting in a gestalt that is of its time and does not look back. When free jazz seemed like a spent force, he brought something new—and greatly beautiful—to it.”

Shipp's other dues-paying sideman relationship came as a member of Roscoe Mitchell’s Note Factory, which Shipp said “could be seen as an extension of some post-Coltrane concepts, but in Roscoe’s hands it is extended technique with multiple pulses.” Shipp went on to write, “I think the one thing that struck me the most about Roscoe the years I worked with him was his insistence at all times of transcending cliché.”<

Shipp has recorded or performed with many other musicians, including High Priest and Beans of Antipop Consortium, Michael Bisio, Daniel Carter, DJ Spooky, El-P, Mat Maneri, Joe Morris, Ivo Perelman, Mat Walerian, Allen Lowe, and Chad Fowler. He has also co-led the group East Axis, with bassist Kevin Ray, drummer Gerald Cleaver, and saxophonists Allen Lowe (first album) and Scott Robinson (second album).

In February 2011, Shipp released a double-disc album entitled Art of the Improviser. This release is "testament to Shipp's achievements, yet it is also a continuation of the discovery in his developmental musical language." The Chicago Tribune called the project "monumental" and "galvanic as ever."

Shipp has been continuously improving his repertoire from touring the world, writing new compositions and, since 2011, has been collaborating with Barbara Januszkiewicz. Together they are exploring new territory through an avant-garde film called The Composer with Matthew Shipp / Barb Januszkiewicz.

On September 24, 2013, Thirsty Ear Records released a solo piano CD by Shipp called Piano Sutras. Will Layman, writing for PopMatters, described it as: the kind of record we talk about and play for each other decades later... This is music that frames up a whole history: of an artist, of listeners, of the artists who formed the history of the art form, of the culture and time that allowed this art to flourish.

Shipp’s relationship with Thirsty Ear ended in 2015 with The Conduct of Jazz, the first album by his current trio lineup with bassist Michael Bisio and drummer Newman Taylor Baker. Since then he has worked most, as a leader, with three other labels. His work with the France-based RogueArt imprint began with the 2006 album Salute to 100001 Stars: A Tribute to Jean Genet by the group Declared Enemy (Sabir Mateen, Shipp, William Parker, and Gerald Cleaver), but until two 2015 albums, only one RogueArt release, Un Piano, billed Shipp as leader. Including those two 2015 releases, through 2022, RogueArt put out six albums with Shipp as leader and another nine on which he was co-billed with, among others, Mark Helias, Nate Wooley, William Parker, Mat Maneri, John Butcher, and Evan Parker.

Shipp began working with ESP-Disk’ with the Shipp/Mat Walerian duo album Live at Okuden, billed as The Uppercut. Issued in 2015, it was the last new release approved by ESP-Disk’ founder Bernard Stollman. All four of Walerian’s albums with Shipp have been released on ESP-Disk’. Shipp’s first ESP albums as leader were a quartet album, Sonic Fiction, and a solo album, Zer0, both issued in 2018. Since then, his releases as leader have all been with his trio with Michael Bisio and Newman Taylor Baker: Signature, The Unidentifiable, and World Construct. The latter was called “a career-defining album” and awarded five stars by critic Mike Hobart in the Financial Times. In 2022 a duo album by Shipp and Ivo Perelman, Fruition, was released by ESP, with NPR’s Nate Chinen stating in his review, “The freeform alchemy between Brazilian saxophonist Ivo Perelman and American pianist Matthew Shipp is by now a proven fact: rarely do two musicians achieve a higher flow state in real time.”

Longtime Shipp collaborator Whit Dickey started a label named Tao Forms in 2020 that as of January 2023 has released two Shipp albums, The Piano Equation and Codebreaker, both solo releases, and four further albums on which he collaborates.

Discography

As leader/co-leader

As sideman

Bibliography
 Logos And Language: A Post-Jazz Metaphorical Dialogue (RogueArt, 2008) with Steve Dalachinsky

References

External links
Official site
Culture Catch Music Salon & Dusty Wright Interview with Shipp
Contrapuntal Kaleidoscope Man

1960 births
Living people
Free improvisation pianists
Free jazz pianists
Post-bop pianists
University of Delaware alumni
New England Conservatory alumni
African-American jazz pianists
African-American jazz musicians
Musicians from Wilmington, Delaware
Avant-garde jazz pianists
20th-century American pianists
American male pianists
21st-century American pianists
20th-century American male musicians
21st-century American male musicians
American male jazz musicians
Thirsty Ear Recordings artists
RogueArt artists
Cadence Jazz Records artists
20th-century African-American musicians
21st-century African-American musicians